Tolip Stadium, commonly referred to as Borg El Arab Stadium subfield, is a football stadium in Borg El Arab, Alexandria, Egypt. It is located near Borg El Arab Stadium, and is mostly used as a training ground for teams before matches at the main stadium. The stadium is also used by Pharco to host some of their home matches, and sometimes by the Egyptian national U-23 team to host their friendly matches.

During the 2017–18 Egyptian Premier League season, El Raja, a club from Mersa Matruh, used Tolip Stadium as their home ground because there was no suitable stadium in Mersa Matruh to host Egyptian Premier League matches.

References

See also
 Borg El Arab Stadium
 Alexandria Stadium
 Haras El Hodoud Stadium
 Sports in Alexandria

Football venues in Egypt
Sports venues in Alexandria
Sports venues completed in 2007
2007 establishments in Egypt
21st-century architecture in Egypt